The national monuments of Ecuador provide a unique insight into a country with a rich history and culture. Most monuments are reflects of the country and its position in the equator as well as monuments depicting its tradition of pre-Columbian civilizations and Spaniard influence.

List
Mitad del mundo;
Ingapirca;
arco de la capilla del rosario;
carondelet palace;
metropolitan cathedral quito;
la rotonda;
the moorish clock tower;

References

 
Ecuador
Lists of tourist attractions in Ecuador